The Helena Museum of Phillips County is a historic building at 623 Pecan Street in Helena, Arkansas.  The main portion of the building is a -story mansard-roofed Second Empire structure, and was built in 1891 with funds raised by the Women's Library Association.  It is Helena's oldest civic building, and was used not just to house the library, but also as a social venue until about 1914, when its main space was fully devoted to the library.  In 1929 a -story wing was added to rear to serve as a space for museum exhibits on local history.

The building was listed on the National Register of Historic Places in 1975.

See also
National Register of Historic Places listings in Phillips County, Arkansas

References

External links
 Helena Museum of Phillips County

Libraries on the National Register of Historic Places in Arkansas
Buildings and structures on the National Register of Historic Places in Arkansas
Museums on the National Register of Historic Places
Library buildings completed in 1890
Buildings and structures in Phillips County, Arkansas
Museums in Helena, Arkansas
History museums in Arkansas
Libraries in Arkansas
National Register of Historic Places in Phillips County, Arkansas
Historic district contributing properties in Arkansas